

Lewotobi is a twin volcano located in the southeastern part of the island of Flores, Indonesia. It is composed of the Lewotobi Lakilaki (Male Lewotobi) and Lewotobi Perempuan (Female Lewotobi) stratovolcanoes.

Older forms of its name include Lobetabi, Lovotivo and Loby Toby.

See also 
 List of volcanoes in Indonesia

References

Citations

Bibliography

Lewotobi
Lewotobi
Lewotobi
Lewotobi
Holocene stratovolcanoes